Fitra Ridwan Salam (born 16 March 1994, in Banda Aceh) is an Indonesian professional footballer who plays as a midfielder for Liga 1 club Persik Kediri.

Club career

Bhayangkara
Fitra Ridwan made his debut against PS TNI, although replacing Evan Dimas when evan followed training in Spain with RCD Espanyol B

Persegres Gresik United
Fitra Ridwan rejoined to Persegres Gresik United in 2017 Liga 1, after earlier in 2015, Fitra had joined to Persegres Gresik United in 2015 Indonesia Super League

Persija Jakarta 
In August 2017, he joined Persija Jakarta to play in Liga 1. Fitra made his debut on 6 August 2017 in a match against Barito Putera. On 30 September 2017, Fitra scored his first goal for Persija against PS TNI in the 13th minute at the Patriot Candrabhaga Stadium, Bekasi.

PSS Sleman
In 2020, Fitra signed a one-year contract with Indonesian Liga 1 club PSS Sleman. He made his debut on 1 March 2020 in a match against PSM Makassar. This season was suspended on 27 March 2020 due to the COVID-19 pandemic. The season was abandoned and was declared void on 20 January 2021.

Persik Kediri
In 2022, Fitra signed a contract with Indonesian Liga 1 club Persik Kediri. He made his league debut on 8 January 2022 in a match against Borneo at the Kapten I Wayan Dipta Stadium, Gianyar.

Honours

Club

Persija Jakarta
 Liga 1: 2018
 Indonesia President's Cup: 2018

PSS Sleman
 Menpora Cup third place: 2021

References

External links
 Fitra Ridwan at Soccerway
 Fitra Ridwan at Liga Indonesia

Living people
1994 births
People from Banda Aceh
Sportspeople from Aceh
Persiraja Banda Aceh players
Persegres Gresik players
Gresik United players
Bhayangkara F.C. players
Persija Jakarta players
PSS Sleman players
Persik Kediri players
Indonesian footballers
Indonesia youth international footballers
Association football midfielders
21st-century Indonesian people